Sam or Samuel George may refer to:
 Sam George (surfer), surfer, writer, director and screenwriter
 Sam George (activist) (1952–2009), Canadian native rights activist
 Sam George (soccer) (born 1970), U.S. soccer midfielder
 Sam Nartey George, Ghanaian politician
 Samantha George,  who uses pen name Sam George, academic and writer
 Samuel George (1795–1873), Onondaga Indian chief

See also